The governor of Catanduanes is the local chief executive and head of the Provincial Government of Catanduanes in the Philippines. Along with the governors of Albay, Camarines Norte, Camarines Sur, Masbate, and Sorsogon, the province's chief executive is a member of the Regional Development Council of the Bicol Region.

List of governors of Catanduanes

References

Governors of Catanduanes
Governors of provinces of the Philippines